Soheyl Jaoudat (born 30 September 1991) is a Moroccan professional rugby union player. He plays as a centre for Rugby United New York in Major League Rugby, previously playing at centre and fly half for the Austin Elite in Major League Rugby.

References

1996 births
Living people
Austin Gilgronis players
Expatriate rugby union players in the United States
Moroccan expatriate rugby union players
Moroccan expatriate sportspeople in the United States
Rugby New York players
Sportspeople from Clermont-Ferrand
Rugby union centres